Sauerbruch is a German surname, which means "sour marsh", from the German sauer ("sour") and the Middle High German bruoch, meaning a "marsh" or stream that often flooded. The name may refer to:

Ferdinand Sauerbruch (1875–1951), German surgeon
Matthias Sauerbruch (born 1955), German architect 
Peter Sauerbruch (1913–2010), German soldier

See also
13086 Sauerbruch, a main-belt asteroid
Sauerbruch chamber
Sauerbruch – Das war mein Leben, a 1954 German film
Sauerbruch Hutton, a German architecture firm

References

German-language surnames